Olivet College is a private Christian liberal arts college located in Olivet, Michigan. The college is accredited by the Higher Learning Commission. It was founded in 1844 by missionaries from Oberlin College, and it followed Oberlin in becoming the second coeducational college or university in the United States.  Olivet College is affiliated with the United Church of Christ and the National Association of Congregational Christian Churches and stands in the Reformed tradition of Protestantism.

History
In 1844, after founding Oberlin College, Rev. John J. Shipherd and 39 missionaries, including Oberlin faculty, students, and alumni, came to Michigan to create a college, which Shipherd deemed "New Oberlin."

Olivetian lore says that while Shipherd was on a trip to the site in Ingham County, his horse continued to get lost, and would always wander back to a hill with an oak grove, which is where Olivet's Campus Square exists today. Shipherd decided that powers from above must be drawing the horse back to this site, and Shipherd deemed that this would become the site for "New Oberlin." He then chose to name it Olivet, however, after the biblical Mount of Olives. 

The first courses began in December 1844. Because President Reuben Hatch's petition for a charter was denied, Olivet became the Olivet Institute, and remained a two-year school until chartered in 1859.

The 20th century saw Olivet College become a liberal arts school, with a short-lived attempt at an Oxford-style curriculum from 1934 to 1944.

A marker designating the college as a Michigan Historic Site was erected in 1960 by the Michigan Historical Commission. The inscription reads:

On February 24, 1844, the Reverend John J.“Father” Shipherd and thirty-nine followers arrived by ox-cart on this wilderness hilltop, driving their herds before them. They felt God had directed them to this oak grove for the purpose of founding a coeducational Christian college open to students of all races. First chartered as Olivet Institute, the school received its charter as a college in 1859. For over a century it has given a broad liberal arts education, with strong support from the Congregational church. Many alumni have gone forth “Pro Christo et Humanitate".
After assuming leadership in 2010, President Steven Corey announced the "Olivet College 2020 and Beyond Strategic Plan", which includes renovating existing buildings and facilities, creating a new student center, increasing endowment, and expand the student population to 1,500.

Academics
Olivet offers 32 programs that lead to a bachelor's degree and a master's degree of Business Administration in Insurance. Its most popular undergraduate majors, in terms of 2021 graduates, were:
Criminal Justice/Safety Studies (19)
Psychology (18)
Business Administration & Management (15)
Insurance (14)
Registered Nursing/Registered Nurse (11)
Exercise Science & Kinesiology (10)

Student-to-faculty ratio is 16:1. Olivet College has approximately 1,040 students, 40% female and 60% male. 74% of classes have less than 24 students, and there is a 16:1 student/faculty ratio. The college has a 59% retention rate for first to second year students.

For the 2018–2019 school year, tuition is currently $26,748, room and board is $9,590, yearly fees are $912, and miscellaneous costs are $3,966. Approximately 99% of students receive some sort of financial aid.

Athletics
Along with Albion College and Michigan Agricultural College (now Michigan State University), Olivet founded the Michigan Intercollegiate Athletic Association (MIAA) in 1888. The MIAA is the nation's oldest collegiate conference. Olivet College athletic teams, nicknamed the Comets, participate in the following intercollegiate sports as a member of the MIAA include:

Men baseball, basketball, bowling, cross country, football, golf, soccer, swimming & diving, tennis, track & field (indoor and outdoor), volleyball and wrestling. Volleyball became a full varsity sport in 2015–16 (2016 season), competing in the Midwest Collegiate Volleyball League.

Women basketball, bowling, cross country, golf, soccer, softball, swimming & diving, tennis, track & field (indoor and outdoor), volleyball, and cheerleading.

Olivet College Radio

Olivet College has an FCC-Licensed Non-Commercial Educational student-run radio station, broadcasting in the Olivet area at 89.1 MHz FM with the callsign WOCR. The broadcast is also available for people outside the studio range online at. Students can volunteer for a radio shift from 7:30am to midnight Monday through Friday to broadcast music, campus events, news, and talk shows. Comet Football and Basketball is also often broadcast live from the game site.

Notable alumni
Edith Vosburgh Alvord (1895), President of Twentieth Century Club of Detroit 1913, President Detroit Federation of Women’s Clubs 1914
 John Henry Barrows (1867), fifth President of Oberlin College
Hamilton King (1878), United States Minister to Siam (Thailand) from 1898 to 1912
 Augusta Jane Chapin, 2010 inductee into Michigan Women's Hall of Fame
 Adeola Fayehun (2007), Nigerian journalist
 Daron Cruickshank, current mixed martial artist competing in the UFC's Lightweight Division
 Dave Cutler (1965), software engineer, designer and developer of operating systems including Windows NT at Microsoft and RSX-11M, VMS and VAXELN at Digital Equipment Corporation
 James C. Harrison (did not graduate), artist
 James McCloughan (1968), Recipient of the Medal of Honor in 2017
 Wolfgang Mieder, educator
Joseph S. Murphy (1955), President of Queens College, President of Bennington College, and Chancellor of the City University of New York
 George Pyne III (1965) football player
 John Ray (1950), football player and coach
 Sugar Chile Robinson, child musical prodigy
 Vern Ruhle (1975), MLB pitcher and coach
 Claressa Shields, Olympic boxing gold medalist
 Scott Sigler, author of science-fiction and horror, podcaster
 John Swainson, 42nd Governor of Michigan
 Ralph Thacker (1909), college football coach
 Robie Macauley (did not graduate), editor, novelist and critic whose literary career spanned more than 50 years
 Justin Jaynes, current mixed martial artist competing in UFC Featherweight division.

Notable faculty
Sherwood Anderson, creative writing
George Whitefield Chadwick, composer
Hubert Lyman Clark, zoology
Amos Dresser, abolitionist and pacifist minister, one of the founders
Ford Madox Ford, creative writing
Alfred Korzybski, semantics
Golo Mann, history
Gertrude Stein, guest lecturer, creative writing

See also

Soronian

References

External links

 Official website
 Official athletics website

 
Education in Eaton County, Michigan
Universities and colleges affiliated with the United Church of Christ
Educational institutions established in 1844
Buildings and structures in Eaton County, Michigan
1844 establishments in Michigan
Private universities and colleges in Michigan